The 2016 German terror plot was a plot by ISIL to commit a terror attack in Germany in 2016. Three teams of attackers planned travel to Germany, to prepare and execute a large-scale attack on a music festival, the name of which hasn't been published yet. The plot was made public only in October 2018, when NDR, WDR and Süddeutsche Zeitung led an interview with a German ISIL supporter. Bundeskriminalamt and Bundesanwaltschaft (Federal Prosecutor's Office) led the investigations. The German Public Prosecutor General, Peter Frank, confirmed the plot, saying: "For us, the facts in this case were very concrete and resilient."

Incidents
The Hildesheim ISIL supporter Oguz G. and his Salzgitter wife Marcia M., who emigrated to Syria in support of ISIL in 2015, played a central role. When Kurdish units conquered the then ISIL capital Rakka in October 2017, the two turned to the Kurdish authorities, which detained them in the Kurdish-controlled areas of Syria. Marcia M. had been trying to recruit potential supporters from Syria and to persuade female Islamists in northern Germany via the internet to marry ISIL fighters as a camouflage for the operation, but came to an informant of the Office for the Protection of the Constitution. The recruited women should then have invited the fighters to Germany so that they could commit the planned attack there. The orders for the attacks could go back to a senior ISIL official with the fighting name Abu Mussab al-Almani alias the Swiss Thomas C., who is said to have been killed fighting in Syria.

The plan ultimately failed due to investigators' knowledge about it and the disintegration of the ISIL militia in Syria.

Legal proceedings
Arrest warrants against Oguz G. and Marcia M. have been released; they are waiting for their extradition to Germany.

See also
 2016 Ansbach bombing
 2016 Chemnitz terrorism plot
 2016 Düsseldorf terrorism plot
 2016 Ludwigshafen bombing plot
 Democratic Federation of Northern Syria
 Rock am Ring and Rock im Park#2017 festival
 Islamic terrorism in Europe

References

2016 crimes in Germany
Failed terrorist attempts in Germany
ISIL terrorist incidents in Germany
Islamic terrorism in Germany
Islamic terrorist incidents in 2016
2016 in Germany
Terrorist incidents in Germany in 2016